Beijing was first linked to outside areas by the Jingshi Expressway in the late 1980s and early 1990s. Now, many expressways link Beijing, and future expressways are planned.

History
When the Airport Expressway and the Jingjintang Expressway opened, Beijing was already being gripped by "expressway fever". Out in the far eastern part of the town lay an unpopular Jingha Expressway; only with the construction of the Jingtong Expressway in the mid-1990s did the Jingha Expressway get more recognition. It is still too far from central Beijing to be considered a key expressway.

By the People's Republic of China's 50th anniversary, however, more expressways were being built in Beijing. The Badaling Expressway, Jingshen Expressway and (in 2000) the Jingkai Expressway were built. Beijing now had eight expressways.

In 2001 the Jingcheng Expressway was built. The northeastern and southeastern parts are ready to accommodate two more expressways (the Jingping/Jingji and Northern Jingji Expressways, respectively).

By 2006, the 6th Ring Road would be completed. Also in that year, a major batch of expressways would be completed.

The main expressways around Beijing are in total 15 (Jingping/Jingji, Northern Jingjin, Southern Jingjin, 2nd Airport Expressway, Northern Airport Expressway and Litian Expressway, plus the nine existing expressways) and 11 of these radiate from city centre of Beijing, since the majority of residents gradually tend to live far from the city centre.

2005 plan
In early January 2005, mainland authorities revealed a plan for seven national expressways originating from Beijing. Amongst those included an expressway bound straight for Taiwan.

The expressways include:

 Beijing - Shanghai (Jinghu Expressway)
 Beijing - Taipei
 Beijing - Kunming
 Beijing - Hong Kong/Macau
 Beijing - Lhasa
 Beijing - Urumqi
 Beijing - Harbin

After the "Three Links" come into effect, the projected  of mainland expressways will have a link, possibly by tunnel, to Taiwan and all expressways on the island.

List of Routes

National-level expressways

Provincial-level expressways

See also 
 China National Highways
 Expressways of China

References

Expressways in Beijing